This is a timeline of events related to the Spanish American wars of independence. Numerous wars against Spanish rule in Spanish America took place during the early 19th century, from 1808 until 1829, directly related to the Napoleonic French invasion of Spain. The conflict started with short-lived governing juntas established in Chuquisaca and Quito opposing the composition of the Supreme Central Junta of Seville. When the Central Junta fell to the French, numerous new Juntas appeared all across the Americas, eventually resulting in a chain of newly independent countries stretching from Argentina and Chile in the south, to Mexico in the north. After the death of the king Ferdinand VII, in 1833, only Cuba and Puerto Rico remained under Spanish rule, until the Spanish–American War in 1898.

These conflicts can be characterized both as civil wars and wars of national liberation, since the majority of the combatants were Spanish Americans on both sides, and the goal of the conflict for one side was the independence of the Spanish colonies in the Americas. In addition, the wars were related to the more general Latin American wars of independence, which include the conflicts in Haiti and Brazil (Brazil's independence shared a common starting point with Spanish America's, since both were triggered by Napoleon's invasion of the Iberian Peninsula, when the Portuguese royal family resettled in Brazil).

The war in Europe, and the resulting absolutist restoration ultimately convinced the Spanish Americans of the need to establish independence from the mother country, so various revolutions broke out in Spanish America. Moreover, the process of Latin American independence took place in the general political and intellectual climate that emerged from the Age of Enlightenment and that influenced all of the so-called Atlantic Revolutions, including the earlier revolutions in the United States and France. Nevertheless, the wars in, and the independence of, Spanish America were the result of unique developments within the Spanish Monarchy.

1806

 Miranda's attempt to invade Venezuela in 1806 is defeated.

1808
 Napoleon Bonaparte invades Portugal across Spanish territory. The governing dynasty, the Braganza, flees to colonial Brazil under British protection.
 Napoleon orders the French army to not occupy Spain in February.

1809
 British forces led by Sir Arthur Wellesley join the Peninsular War, supporting the Spanish resistance.

1810
 Spain is dominated by French forces and the Supreme Central and Governing Junta is defeated

1811
 Hidalgo is defeated in Mexico

1812
 Spain enacts a Constitution. First Spanish expeditionaries arrive to Americas on January to support the Royalists.
 The First Republic is created in Venezuela

1813

 Simón Bolívar gathers an army to free Venezuela. He signs the Decree of War to the Death and triumphantly enters Caracas
 Mexico abolishes slavery privileges and indigenous tribute, and later declares independence

1814
 Ferdinand VII returns to Spain. Absolutism is restored; the 1812 Constitution is repealed and the Cortes dissolved.
 Venezuela creates the short-lived Second Republic; Bolívar is defeated and moves to New Granada
 Bolívar conquers Bogotá
 Mexico enacts a Constitution

1815
 A Spanish Army of overseas sails from Cadiz led by Pablo Morillo, in order to retake the former colonies in South America.
 Simón Bolívar moves to Jamaica

1816
 Only the region of the Río de la Plata remains under patriotic control.

1817
 José de San Martín leads the Crossing of the Andes, defeats the Chilean royalists at the Battle of Chacabuco, and triumphantly enters Santiago, Chile

1818
 Simón Bolívar organizes a third Venezuelan republic in Angostura and calls for a congress. Bolivar's campaign to take Caracas is defeated, and he returns to the line of Orinoco river.
 The patriotic triumph at the Battle of Maipú guarantees the independence of Chile

1819
 Bolívar defeats the royalists at the Battle of Boyacá. New Granada is liberated
 The Congress of Angostura creates Gran Colombia; Bolívar is elected its president.

1821
 The triumph of Bolívar at Carabobo guarantees the independence of Venezuela
 The Spanish Captain-General in Mexico City recognizes Mexico's independence but the royal government in Madrid does not. Mexico forms a constitutional monarchy.
 Brazil annexes the Banda Oriental to their territories

1822
 The United States recognizes the independence of the former Spanish colonies
 Bolívar and San Martin meet at Guayaquil
 San Martin resigns from power in Peru and leaves Lima
 Antonio José de Sucre defeats the royalists at the Battle of Pichincha
 Ecuador joins Gran Colombia
 Agustín de Iturbide is proclaimed Emperor of Mexico, under the name Agustín I

1823

 End of siege of Puerto Cabello Fostress (Venezuela)
 A liberal riot in Mexico forces Iturbide to abdicate
 The Federal Republic of Central America is created

1824
 Mexico is declared a federal republic and enacts a Constitution
 The Battle of Ayacucho ends the Spanish presence in Peru
 The government of Ramón Freire in Chile, led by Jorge Beauchef, fails to capture Chiloé Archipelago from the Spanish

1825
 End of siege of San Juan de Ulúa Fostress (Mexico)
 Pedro Antonio Olañeta dies in the Battle of Tumusla (Bolivia).

1826
 End of siege of Real Felipe Fortress (Perú)
 Capitulation of Spanish Chilé Province

1827
 Jose Arizabalo, with support of Captaincy General of Puerto Rico, starts the last royalist guerrilla in Venezuela, defeated in 1829.

1828
 Mexican Navy under the command of David Porter is defeated in the Caribbean.

1829
 The last attempt of Ferdinand VII of Spain to reconquer Spanish America. Isidro Barradas was defeated in the battle of Tampico (Mexico).

1830
 On May, Venezuela and then Ecuador separate themselves from the Gran Colombia, causing its final breaking the next year.
July Revolution returns the liberalism to France. Ferdinand VII lost the French military support to maintain the absolutism in Spain.
 Marshal Antonio José de Sucre is assassinated and liberator Simón Bolívar dies from disease at the end of the year.

1833
 King Ferdinand VII dies.

1836

 Spain renounces its domains in continental Americas and authorizes the government to conclude treaties with all the states of Spanish America.

See also
Spanish colonization of the Americas
Spanish American wars of independence

Bibliography
Higgins, James (2014). The Emancipation of Peru: British Eyewitness Accounts. Online at https://sites.google.com/site/jhemanperu
 

Spanish American Wars
 Timeline
 Timeline
Independence
Spanish American wars of independence
Spanish American wars of independence
Spanish American wars of independence
Spanish American wars of independence